Hamilton County Courthouse may refer to:

 Hamilton County Courthouse (Illinois), McLeansboro, Illinois
 Hamilton County Courthouse (Indiana), Noblesville, Indiana
 Hamilton County Courthouse (Iowa), Webster City, Iowa
 Hamilton County Courthouse (Kansas), Syracuse, Kansas
 Hamilton County Courthouse (Nebraska), Aurora, Nebraska
 Hamilton County Courthouse Complex , Lake Pleasant, New York
 Hamilton County Courthouse (Ohio), Cincinnati, Ohio
 Hamilton County Courthouse (Tennessee), Chattanooga, Tennessee
 Hamilton County Courthouse (Texas), Hamilton, Texas